Skerries RFC is an Irish rugby team based in Skerries, Dublin in the province of Leinster. They play in Division 2C of the All-Ireland League.

The club was founded and became a member of the Leinster Branch of the IRFU in 1926. They played their first recorded match against Drogheda, and won by 9 points to 8.

The club has 2 pitches: 1x grass and 1x 3G state-of-the-art pitch (opened November 2019).

The club has a long-standing relationship with the local secondary school Skerries Community College, formerly De La Salle Secondary College Skerries, where many past and current players attended. The college makes use of the grounds at Holmpatrick for training and home matches. The club has a long relationship with Dunbar RFC located on the east coast of Scotland, who they have been playing since 1952. This association is the longest continuous club fixture between a pair of Irish and Scottish rugby clubs.

The club is community based and field the following teams (Levels):

Male: 2 adult (Senior AIL & Junior Leinster Metro), U19s (JP Fanagan), youths: U13 to U18 & minis: U6 to U12.

Female: Girls U14 and U16 teams. All girls up to age 18 are most welcome as the club actively build their female participation, those aged 6 to 12 playing mini rugby combined with boys.

Honours

Leinster Senior League Shield
Winners: 2012-13:  1

National team players
 Bill Mulcahy
 Jim Glennon
 Killian Keane

References

Skerries RFC

Irish rugby union teams
Rugby clubs established in 1926
Rugby union clubs in Fingal
Senior Irish rugby clubs (Leinster)